Euphaedra pallas is a butterfly in the family Nymphalidae. It is found in Guinea.

Similar species
Other members of the Euphaedra zaddachii species group q.v.

References

Butterflies described in 2004
pallas
Endemic fauna of Guinea
Butterflies of Africa